Druids Heath is a large housing estate in southern Birmingham, England covering the south-west quadrant of the B14 postcode (west of the Maypole). Primarily known for the large council estate in the Brandwood ward of south Birmingham. The estate is situated on former farmland on the southern edge of Bells Lane with Druids Lane forming the eastern, southern and western border. When first planned, it was known as Bells Lane Phases 1 and 2 and was part of wider postwar plans for the development of the area to accommodate the growing population of the city. Nearby settlements include Kings Heath and Kings Norton; it used to be part of them.

Part of Druids Heath was ranked as the most deprived area in Birmingham and in the top 50 most deprived areas in the country in the 2019 Multiple deprivation index.

Etymology
The name Druids Heath was formerly Drews Heath named after a local family who farmed here until the mid-19th century. Drew's Farm stood at the junction of Druids Lane and Bells Lane near the Maypole. .

Politics
As of 2018 Druids Heath is in the local council ward of Druids Heath and Monyhull, which is represented by Green Party councillor Julien Pritchard.  It is also in the parliamentary constituency of Selly Oak. Therefore, it is represented in the House of Commons by the Labour Member of Parliament (MP) Steve McCabe.

Education
The schools within the Druids Heath area are; The Baverstock Academy (closed 2017), Bells Farm Primary School, The Oaks Primary School and St. Jude's RC Junior and Infant School.

References

Areas of Birmingham, West Midlands